Eristena tanongchiti is a moth in the family Crambidae. It was described by Yoshiyasu in 1984. It is found in Thailand and China.

References

Acentropinae
Moths described in 1984